Scriber Lake Park is a 22-acre community park and nature refuge in Lynnwood, Washington. Scriber Lake is completely located in the park.

The lake was named after Peter Schriber, an early settler.

References

External links
 City of Lynnwood: Scriber Lake Park (Archive 2015-09-16)

Parks in Washington (state)
Parks in Snohomish County, Washington
Lynnwood, Washington